Filetopia is a free, multi-platform peer-to-peer file sharing client, and networking tool that allows users to share files, use chat, and send instant messages. Users can share files in public chat rooms or privately with contacts (by searching or using shared files list). As it is not a centralized system, users must connect to a network made of multiple servers in order to find each other. However all the file transfers, secure chat, etc. are conducted on a peer-to-peer basis. By default Filetopia is not an anonymous peer to peer network: when sending or downloading files, IP addresses are not visible, but the software makes no attempt at keeping them anonymous.

History 
Filetopia software development started in October 1998 and the first public beta was released in March 1999.  In April 2012, development began on a project to completely rewrite the program in Java FX. This version was eventually released as Filetopia FX.
The classic Filetopia software version (3.04d, 2002), is still (as of 2015) a small, but vibrant community of people sharing a wealth of data.

In 2003, Filetopia v3.04 was reviewed in PC Magazine, and rated 3/5.

In 2004, the author of Filetopia was interviewed on the web site Slyck.com.

Filetopia FX (from 2015) 

This Filetopia FX version is more focused in hosting Online Communities than in file sharing, disallowing global-wide file searching and encouraging meeting new people. It is a complete rewrite using modern technologies which improves over the Classic version in the following areas:

 The maximum file size limit of 2 GB has been removed.

 Graphic chat was vastly improved. There are configurable chat presets, hundreds of emoticons and users have the ability to add new ones and capture those they like from the chat. Users also have the ability to post images and HTML fragments (which are filtered for security purposes). Lastly, improvements have been made on all existing chat features.

 Messages now use the same technology behind the chat and can take advantage of all its graphic features.

 Room Walls are now graphic and have comments, votes, moderation and are able to notify admins and subscribers of changes.

 The Log is now a graphic one, that is kept encrypted for security purposes. with a powerful search function. In addition, logs now have a powerful search feature to enable users to quickly find what they are looking for.

 File sharing protocols were completely rewritten. They now allow much higher transfer speeds and better performance, and transfers feature a speed graph to track download/upload.

 Preferences have been made more user-friendly, including having its own tab.

 The User Interface is the main visible difference in Filetopia FX.  Improvements include more than 10 new themes that completely change the look of the program, draggable tabs, floating windows, a sidebar for easy access to contacts, messages, and lists, multi-monitor support and more.

  Moderation tools were improved to help room owners and moderators maintain a safe and fun community for all users.

  Network protocols have been updated to improve speeds and increase capacity. P2P protocols are more reliable and able to function without the need of the Filetopia Network for many functions, including file sharing. Users can also host their own rooms, which are excluded from the main P2P network.

Communication 

Filetopia FX features a graphic chat, which integrates security features, file sharing, file search, a graphic and searchable log system, hundreds of emoticons and ability for the user to add their own emoticons, even animated ones and capture the emoticons used by others.

The chat is also fully moderated, with the ability to kick or ban users, gag users, hide posts and has 3 levels of room moderation: owner, admin and helper.

Public and private Chats can use entry passwords. There is a secure direct chat feature that is not hosted on the Filetopia Network but in the user's computers and is accessed using special encrypted access data.

Wall 
All public chat rooms have an associated message wall to it. It allows moderated posts, with comments, votes, etc.

Instant messaging 
Filetopia is also a full featured Instant Messenger software, that allows for different online modes and status lines, as well as messaging offline users.

List management 
Lists are the basis for file sharing in Filetopia. An unlimited number of lists can be created, and assigned to different groups, users, or rooms.

Lists are fully browsable and configurable and allow users to share exactly what they want with whom they want. Users can queue many downloads and can also download complete folders.

See also

 Online community
 RetroShare (software with similar features)

References

External links
 Filetopia home page
 www.filetopia.be - Filetopia Webring, down since 2008, archive

Communication software
Windows file sharing software